Lewson Street is a village near the A2 road, in the Swale District, in the English county of Kent. It is near the towns of Sittingbourne and Faversham.

References
A-Z Great Britain Road Atlas (page 40)

Borough of Swale
Villages in Kent